Margaret Stanley may refer to:
Margaret Stanley (virologist), British virologist and epithelial biologist
Margaret Beaufort, Countess of Richmond and Derby (1443–1509), married name Margaret Stanley, mother of Henry VII of England
Margaret Stanley, Countess of Derby (1540–1596), great-granddaughter of Henry VII of England